Taddeo Zuccaro (or Zuccari) (1 September 15292 September 1566) was an Italian painter, one of the most popular members of the Roman mannerist school.

Biography
Zuccaro was born in Sant'Angelo in Vado, near Urbino, the son of Ottaviano Zuccaro, an almost unknown painter. His brother Federico, born around 1540, was also a painter and architect. As a young man Taddeo was to be encouraged by Pompeo da Fano.

Zuccaro moved to Rome by age 14, and he succeeded at an early age in gaining a knowledge of painting and in finding patrons to employ him. When he was seventeen a pupil of Correggio, named Daniele da Parma, engaged him to assist in painting a series of frescoes in a chapel at Vitto near Sora, on the borders of the Abruzzi (not corroborated by Freedberg). Zuccaro returned to Rome in 1548, and began his career as a fresco painter, by executing a series of scenes in monochrome from the life of Marcus Furius Camillus on the front of the palace of a wealthy Roman named Jacopo Mattei. From that time his success was assured, and he was largely employed by the popes Julius III and Paul IV, by the della Rovere duke of Urbino, and by other rich patrons. He is documented to have worked alongside Prospero Fontana in decorating the Villa Giulia. In 1556, he painted frescoed Scenes of the Passion in the "Cappella Mattei" of Santa Maria della Consolazione.

His best frescoes were a historical series in quadro riportato painted on the walls and ceiling of Villa Farnese at Caprarola, built for Cardinal Alessandro Farnese, for which Zuccaro also designed a great quantity of rich decorations in stucco relief after the style of Giulio Romano and other pupils of Raphael. He also painted Histories of Alexander in the Castello Orsini at Bracciano. Nearly all his paintings were large, rapidly executed frescos, often in chiaroscuro or monochrome. Stylistically, he also displays a Mannerist taste for sculpted physicality characteristic of Michelangelo. Vasari praised his compositional skill and the refined fluidity and vigour of his style, singling out his treatment of heads, hands and nudes.

Zuccaro's easel pictures are less common than his decorative frescoes. A small painting on copper of the Adoration of the Shepherds, formerly in the collection of James II, is now at Hampton Court Palace. The Caprarola frescoes were engraved and published by Prenner, Illustri Fatti Farnesiani Coloriti nel Real Palazzo di Caprarola (Rome, 1748–50).

He painted Conversion of St. Paul in San Marcello al Corso in Rome.

He died in Rome in 1566, and was buried in the Pantheon, not far from Raphael.

References

External links
The Zuccaro Scholarship
Getty Museum Exhibition Taddeo and Federico Zuccaro: Artist Brothers in Rome

1529 births
1566 deaths
People from the Province of Pesaro and Urbino
16th-century Italian painters
Italian male painters
Italian Mannerist painters
Sibling artists